Karoui is a surname. Notable people with the surname include:

Fayçal Karoui (born 1971), conductor of Tunisian descent
Hamed Karoui (born 1927), Tunisian politician
Nabil Karoui (born 1963), Tunisian businessman and politician
Sahbi Karoui, Tunisian politician
Slah Karoui (born 1951), Tunisian footballer